The first cabinet of Tage Erlander was the cabinet and government of Sweden between 11 October 1946 and 1 October 1951. It was formed following the sudden death of Prime Minister Per Albin Hansson on 6 October 1946.

It was succeeded on 1 October 1951 by the Erlander II Cabinet, a coalition government between the Social Democratic Party and the centre-right Farmers' League.

Policy 
Following the Second World War, social reform was the pillar of Swedish social democracy. The architect behind the Swedish welfare reforms during this period was the Minister for Social Affairs, Gustav Möller.

During the reign of the Erlander I Cabinet, the following reforms were implemented:

 A system of public health insurance for all, legislation which was passed in December 1946 and originally planned to come into effect in 1950, was implemented on 1 January 1955 after two delays. The system included free healthcare, state-funded medication prescriptions and paid sickness leave for workers.
 In 1947, a unanimous Riksdag approved the barnbidrag; a policy of children's allowance for all children younger than 16.
 Rents were lowered and construction of new housing was subsidized.
 The Worker's Protection Board was established in 1949, an authority responsible for protecting workers' rights. Work during the night was essentially prohibited. In 2001, the board was reformed as the Swedish Work Environment Authority.

During the war, it was feared that an economic depression would follow after the war's end. The economist Gunnar Myrdal warned of this coming depression in his 1944 book Varning för fredsoptimism (sv). But in 1945, it became clear that the economy was improving. As a consequence, inflation increased in 1946 and 1947 whilst a deficit in the balance of trade became all the more clear. The Swedish currency reserve ran out when the import surplus reached two billion crowns.

Thus, in 1947, reforms and regulations were implemented in order to curb the Swedish import. Making imports and out-going international payments was made more difficult. Rationing on coffee, tea and cocoa was re-introduced. In April 1948, rationing on gasoline was introduced. The rationing and economic difficulties were criticized by the opposition, especially by the liberal People's Party which under the new leadership of Bertil Ohlin had hardened their policies and become the leading right-wing opposition party. The People's Party along with the Right Wing Party spoke of "Krångel-Sverige" (lit. "Hassle Sweden") and chastised the Social Democrats, branding them as an authoritarian party which wanted to regulate things solely because of principles. The reforms were also regarded as an attempt to socialize the private sector.

An inquiry into Sweden's taxation policy was ordered in October 1945 and the subsequent 1946 report authored by Ernst Wigforss proposed that the income tax on poor people should be lowered while the income tax on people with high incomes should be raised. The final proposed legislation suggested raising the corporate tax from 32% to 40%, mandatory taxation on fortunes exceeding 20 000 crowns and a special tax on certain inherited estates. The debate surrounding the tax reform was harsh. The Svea Court of Appeal ruled the proposed inheritance tax as unconstitutional, since the constitution at the time stated that "no-one is to be deprived of their property without a legal verdict". The tax reform was nonetheless approved by the Riksdag.

The opposition's criticism of government policy was sparked by the 1948 general election, when the tone between the ruling Social Democrats and the opposition turned unusually bitter. A prevalent topic during the election revolved around the financing of the parties. Morgon-Tidningen, a Social Democratic newspaper claimed that the People's Party was receiving contributions from "Big Finance", amounting to almost four million crowns. The claims were later found to be untrue, and were conveyed to the newspaper by a Social Democratic MP. The election was a success for the People's Party which increased its share of the vote by over seven percent. The Right Wing Party and the Swedish Communist Party performed poorly in the election.

Monetary policy was focused on keeping interest rates low. Ivar Rooth, the head of the Swedish National Bank resigned in December 1948 when a dispute between the board and himself regarding implementing policies he regarded as inflationary. In September 1949, the Swedish crown was devalued, a day after the British pound sterling was devalued.

Following the election, the Social Democrats began cooperating more closely with the Farmers' League. Talks were held about forming a coalition were initiated but were ultimately unproductive. In the summer of 1951, however, talks were resumed and on 28 September 1951 it was agreed that a joint Social Democratic and Farmer's League government would be formed. The Farmer's League eventually received four ministerial positions in the Erlander II Cabinet.

Ministers 

|}

References

Bibliography

Footnotes 

1946 establishments in Sweden
Cabinets of Sweden
1946 in Sweden
Swedish Social Democratic Party
1947 in Sweden
1948 in Sweden
1949 in Sweden
1950 in Sweden
1951 in Sweden